The 1998–99 season was the 30th campaign of the Scottish Men's National League, the national basketball league of Scotland. The season featured 10 teams; from the previous season Troon joined the league. Glasgow Sports Division won their first league title, ending the 10 year dominance of the Livingston MIM and Bulls teams.

Teams

The line-up for the 1998–99 season featured the following teams:

Boroughmuir
City of Edinburgh Kings
Clark Erikkson Fury
Dunfermline Reign
Glasgow Sports Division
Glasgow Gators
Midlothian Bulls
Paisley
St Mirren McDonalds
Troon

League table

 Source: Scottish National League 1998-99 - Britball

References

Scottish Basketball Championship Men seasons
basketball
basketball